The 1956 U.S. Open was the 56th U.S. Open, held June 14–16 at the East Course of Oak Hill Country Club near Rochester, New York. Cary Middlecoff won his second U.S. Open title, one stroke ahead of runners-up  Julius Boros and Ben Hogan, both former champions.

Middlecoff began the final round with a two-stroke lead over Hogan, Ted Kroll, and Wes Ellis. After an erratic finish where he bogeyed 16 and 17, he carded a third consecutive round of even-par 70 to post a 281 (+1) total and waited. Hogan, pursuing his record fifth U.S. Open, had a chance to tie Middlecoff but missed a  par putt on the 17th to finish one back. Boros also had a chance to catch Middlecoff, but  missed a  birdie on the last and also finished a stroke behind. The last contender on the course, Kroll led by a stroke after a birdie at the 14th hole, but immediately followed it with a bogey and triple bogey and finished four strokes back.

Reigning British Open champion Peter Thomson made a rare appearance in the United States and finished tied for fourth, his best finish at any other major. He was the 36-hole leader by a stroke over Hogan, but fell back after a four-over 39 on the back nine in the third round. Thomson won five British Opens, and his third consecutive (1954–56) came three weeks later at Royal Liverpool.

Several future champions made their mark at this U.S. Open. Arnold Palmer, 26, recorded the first of his thirteen top ten finishes at the U.S. Open, six strokes back in seventh place. Ken Venturi captured low-amateur honors in eighth place, two months after he lost a four-stroke lead at The Masters with an 80 in the final round.  Billy Casper, 24, made his major championship debut and finished 14th.

Defending champion Jack Fleck, who upset Hogan in a Sunday playoff the year before at Olympic, shot 76-74 and missed the cut by a stroke. Jack Burke Jr., winner of the Masters two months earlier, also missed with a 152.

A record-setting 13,914 were in attendance for the final two rounds on Saturday.

This was the first of three U.S. Opens at the East Course at Oak Hill; Lee Trevino won in 1968 and Curtis Strange successfully defended in 1989. It also hosted the PGA Championship in 1980, 2003, and 2013, and the Ryder Cup in 1995.

Course layout

Past champions in the field

Made the cut 

Source:

Missed the cut 

Source:

Round summaries

First round
Thursday, June 14, 1956

Source:

Second round
Friday, June 15, 1956

Source:

Amateurs: Taylor (+3), Ward (+7), Hyndman (+8), Patton (+8), Venturi (+8), Garrett (+9), Magee (+10), Ervasti (+11), Rodgers (+11), Simmons (+11), Dahlbender (+12), Holland (+12), Croonquist (+15), Shields (+16), Kuntz (+17), Moore Jr (+18), Aldrich (+19), Dixon (+20), Kelly (+23), Beman (+24), Myers (+25), Kleist (+27), Deal (+30), Watson (+34), Mandeville (+35), Brownell (WD).

Third round
Saturday, June 16, 1956 (morning)

Source:

Final round
Saturday, June 16, 1956 (afternoon)

Source:

Amateurs: Venturi (+9), Patton (+12), Taylor (+18), Hyndman (+20), Ward (+25), Garrett (+29).

References

External links
USGA Championship Database
USOpen.com – 1956

U.S. Open (golf)
Golf in New York (state)
Sports in Rochester, New York
U.S. Open
U.S. Open
U.S. Open (golf)
Events in Rochester, New York